Silver Cord Cascade is a horsetail type waterfall on Surface Creek, a tributary of the Yellowstone River in Yellowstone National Park.  Surface Creek flows out of Ribbon Lake off the South rim of the Grand Canyon of the Yellowstone and plunges  to the Yellowstone River.  It is considered the tallest waterfall in Yellowstone.

Silver Cord Cascade was first described by members of the Washburn–Langford–Doane Expedition as Silverthread Falls.

Samuel Hauser and Benjamin Stickney, members of the Washburn Expedition are credited with the name Silverthread Falls.  In 1883, Philetus Norris, then park superintendent, renamed the falls Sliding Cascade.  However, in 1885 the official name, Silver Cord Cascade, was bestowed on the falls by the Arnold Hague Geological Survey.

The brink of the falls can be reached via the Clear Lake-Ribbon Lake trail, while the falls can be viewed from the North rim of the canyon off the Sevenmile Hole trail.

See also
 Waterfalls in Yellowstone National Park

Notes

Landforms of Park County, Wyoming
Waterfalls of Yellowstone National Park
Waterfalls of Wyoming
Tourist attractions in Park County, Wyoming